Sam Bulbulia (22 February 1933 – 10 July 2015) was a South African cricketer. He played three first-class matches for Transvaal in 1972/73.

References

External links
 

1933 births
2015 deaths
South African cricketers
Gauteng cricketers
Cricketers from Johannesburg